Super Show 2 is the second Asia-wide live concert tour by the South Korean boy band Super Junior, to support their third studio album, Sorry, Sorry. The tour commenced with three shows in Seoul, South Korea in July 2009 and continued with one show in Hong Kong, five in China, two in Thailand, two in Taiwan, one in Malaysia and one in Philippines. A total of 15 shows in nine cities and six countries throughout Asia.

Live album Super Show 2 Tour Concert Album, recorded at the concerts held in Seoul from July 17 to 19, 2009, with 35 tracks and five studio version bonus tracks: remixed version of "Sorry, Sorry", R&B ballad "Sorry Sorry-Answer", re-arranged versions of "It's You" and "Shining Star" as well as classic pop track "Puff The Magic Dragon" was released on December 10, 2009.

Concerts
On June 3, 2009, shortly after Super Junior began their promotions on "It's You", from the repackaged edition of their third album Sorry, Sorry, SM Entertainment announced the group's second Asia tour. Thus the promotions for "It's You" ended on June 21 in preparations for the start of the tour in July 2009.

Tickets for the July 17 concert in Seoul went on sale on June 16 at 20:00 and were sold out in 10 minutes. The second and third ticket batch went on sale on June 17 and 18 respectively and were also sold out in under 10 minutes.

The Hong Kong concert was the last Super Junior activity that member Kangin took part in before his activities were suspended following his involvement in a bar fight in the early hours of September 16 in Nonhyeon-dong, Gangnam-gu, Seoul.

The Shanghai concerts of the tour was the official opening performance of the 11th Shanghai International Art Festival, hosted by China's Ministry of Culture. For which they received a medal of appreciation from the city of Shanghai and the concert was attended by 12,000 people.

The two Bangkok concerts was played to an audience of 32,000 and that 5,000 people queued overnight the day before the tickets went on sale."

Setlist

Tour dates

Personnel
 Vocals/dancers: Super Junior
 Choreographers: Super Junior, Nick Bass, Trent Dickens, Hwang Sanghoon, Shim Jaewon
 Tour organizer: SM Entertainment
 Overseas organizers: B4H Entertainment (Hong Kong), Pulp Live Productions (Philippines)
 Tour promoter: Dream Maker Entercom, Creazone
 Overseas promoter(s): Midas Promotions (Hong Kong), True Music (Thailand), Red Star (Malaysia)
 Tour sponsor: Gmarket

Live album

 
Super Show 2 - Super Junior The 2nd Asia Tour Concert Album is the second live album of South Korean boy band Super Junior. It was released on December 10, 2009, by SM Entertainment. The album was recorded at their concerts held at the Olympic Fencing Gymnasium in Seoul, South Korea from July 17 to 19, 2009, the first stop of their 2nd Asia Tour – "Super Show 2".

The album includes 35 live tracks and five studio version bonus tracks: remixed version of "Sorry, sorry", R&B ballad "Sorry Sorry-Answer", re-arranged versions of "It's You" and "Shining Star" as well as classic pop track "Puff The Magic Dragon". "Sorry, Sorry-Answer" and "It's You" were also released online at Melon, Dosirak, and Cyworld before the album's release. A music video of "Sorry Sorry-Answer", was also released on December 10 in celebration of the live album. "Sorry, Sorry - Answer", peaked at number one for 2 weeks on the MYX international countdown.

The album was also released in Taiwan by Avex Taiwan on January 15, 2010. It debuted at number one on Taiwan's G-Music Weekly G-Music J-Pop/K-Pop Chart with percentage sales of 44.69%.

Track listing

Charts

References

External links
 Dream Maker Entercom 
 Super Junior official homepage 
 Super Junior official Avex Taiwan homepage 
 Super Junior official Japanese homepage 

2009 concert tours
2010 concert tours
Super Junior concert tours